Filipa de Vilhena (c. 1585–1651) was a Portuguese courtier. She served as principal lady-in-waiting to queen Luisa de Guzmán. She became known for her legendary farewell to her sons when they left to fight in the Portuguese Restoration War, when she asked them not to return unless covered in glory. She became famous as a symbol of Portuguese patriotism and a subject of a famous play. After the war she was made principal lady-in-waiting to the queen.

References 
 Dicionário Histórico - Portugal

1580s births
1651 deaths
17th-century Portuguese people
Portuguese ladies-in-waiting
People from Lisbon